Finger Lakes Times is an upstate New York daily (except Sunday) newspaper with 19th century roots
 under an earlier name, Geneva Times.

History
The newspaper's initial 19th-century name reflected a more local name, Geneva. In 1977 it was renamed for the region, whose name did not exist when the paper was founded. Their information is
picked up by other newspapers, including The New York Times.

References

Daily newspapers published in New York (state)